Garikapati Mohan Rao (born 5 January 1948 in Warangal, Andhra Pradesh) is an Indian politician of the Bharatiya Janata Party and presently representing Telangana State as a member of parliament, Rajya Sabha.

He completed a B.Sc. degree at C.K.M. College, Warangal.
Joined BJP on 20 June 2019

See also 
 Rajya Sabha members from Telangana

References

 

Telugu politicians
Telangana politicians
Telugu Desam Party politicians
Living people
Rajya Sabha members from Andhra Pradesh
Rajya Sabha members from Telangana
1948 births
Bharatiya Janata Party politicians from Telangana